The Neeley School of Business is the undergraduate and graduate business school at Texas Christian University (TCU), a private university located in Fort Worth, Texas.  The Neeley School is fully accredited by the AACSB. The school provides a range of business education programs, including: BBA, Full-time MBA, Professional MBA, Accelerated MBA, Energy MBA, Health Care MBA, Executive MBA, Master of Science in Supply Chain Management, Master of Accounting, and MBA/Ed.D.

History 
TCU was founded in 1873 by brothers Addison and Randolph Clark in Thorp Spring, Texas, as AddRan Male and Female College, and the School of Business opened in 1884 as Commercial School, renamed School of Business in 1896, and College of Business in 1901. The Department of Business Administration was established in 1922, and became the School of Business in 1938, the first year to offer a master of business administration. Student organizations included the TCU Chamber of Commerce, begun in 1939, and the Collegiate Business and Professional Women's Club. E. M. Sowell was appointed the first dean in 1944. In 1967, the School of Business was named for M.J. Neeley in honor of his personal service of 25 years on the TCU Board of Trustees and financial contributions to TCU. Applications have risen steadily in recent years. The Neeley School of Business currently makes up one-third of the TCU student population.

Campus
TCU is located in the Dallas-Fort Worth Metroplex, the "Fourth Best Metropolitan Area for Business," according to Forbes magazine. Metroplex corporations participate in Neeley School mentorships, internships, special projects, and hiring. The Metroplex is home to DFW International Airport. The Neeley School has active international connections and study abroad programs.

Degree programs

Student initiatives
Neeley & Associates Consulting - MBA students work on paid projects for national and international businesses, providing hands-on experience for students and quality consultation for the business organizations.
Neeley Fellows –  Undergraduate honors program
BNSF Neeley Leadership Program – Undergraduate leadership program
Student Organizations –  American Marketing Association, Association for Information Systems, Beta Alpha Psi, Beta Gamma Sigma, Collegiate Entrepreneurs Club (CEO), Delta Sigma Pi, Financial Management Association, Neeley Associates, Society for Human Resource Management, and Students in Free Enterprise
Neeley Premium Credentials - A personalized professional development program to equip students with the critical skills identified by employers as necessary to succeed in today's business environment.

Centers of Study
 Sales and Customer Insights Center
 Connecting students and businesses for real-world successes. We help students gain unique hands-on, real-world experience. We help businesses tap top talent and gain insight about their sales force and customers to improve market performance.

 Tandy Center for Executive Leadership
 The Tandy Center for Executive Leadership was founded by the Anne Burnett and Charles D. Tandy Foundation to strengthen American business. The center provides leadership training for major corporations and individuals through executive education, executive coaching, certification classes and a speaker series featuring prominent CEOs.

 Neeley Institute for Entrepreneurship and Innovation
 The Neeley Institute for Entrepreneurship and Innovation builds the skills and confidence of prospective and existing young entrepreneurs through teaching, scholarships, internships, research and awards. Special programs include the TCU Texas Youth Entrepreneur of the Year, Family Business Seminar, Global Student Entrepreneur of the Year, Small Business of the Year and Entrepreneurial Expo. The TCU Collegiate Entrepreneur (TCU CEO) organization is the largest in the U.S.

 Center for Supply Chain Innovation
The Center for Supply Chain Innovation develops future global supply chain leaders through academics and programs, the exchange of ideas and best practices between business partners, faculty, students and supply chain experts, and sponsoring leading edge research. The center hosts the annual Global Supply Chain Conference.

 LKCM Center for Financial Studies
 The LKCM Center for Financial Studies is named in honor of Luther King Capital Management, a leading investment advisory firm. The center enhances Neeley’s finance program with scholarships, research awards, industry partnerships and employment opportunities. The center sponsors the TCU High School Investor Challenge and the Investment Strategies Conference.

See also
List of United States business school rankings
List of business schools in the United States

References

External links
Neeley School website
TCU website

Texas Christian University colleges and schools
Business schools in Texas
Educational institutions established in 1884
1884 establishments in Texas